Kuhpar-e Olya (also Romanized as Kūhpar-e ‘Olyā; also known as Kūhpar-e Bālā) is a village in Zanus Rastaq Rural District, Kojur District, Nowshahr County, Mazandaran Province, Iran. At the 2006 census, its population was 100, in 35 families.

References 

Populated places in Nowshahr County